Dareecha is a Pakistani horror-mystery soap television series that aired during 2011–12 on ARY Digital. It was produced by Abdullah Seja and Jeerjes Seja under Idream Entertainment. It featured Fazila Qazi, Sana Askari, Imran Aslam, Yasir Hussain Sonya Hussyn in pivot roles.

Plot 
The drama focuses on the main character Maheen, who faces many challenges in life due to her love marriage with Faizan. Faizan, a psychologically disturbed man, tortures every woman he marries. In the past he has married 4 other women and harmed them physically/mentally. He plans to do the same with Maheen. Soon after, with the help of her sixth sense, Maheen begins to realize that Faizan's family and past has been impacted with black magic. Suspense occurs when Maheen begins to see ghosts of the dead. She must find out Faizan's past and the hidden truths.

Cast

 Fazila Qazi as Geati Aara, Patriarch of Bari haveli and Faizan's mother
 Imran Aslam / Asad Siddiqui as Faizan, Geati Aara's son
 Sana Askari as Maheen, Faizan's wife
 Yasir Hussain	as Shahrukh, servant in Geati Aara's house
 Salma Hassan as Roshan Aara, “Bebo Khala”, Geati Aara's younger sister
 Sonya Hussyn as Surraya, Faizan's office employee
 Fawad Khan as Moeen, Faizan's office employee
 Hina Khawaja Bayat as Shamshad Bibi, a female scholar and Geati Aara's friend
 Kaif Ghaznavi as Shamsa Bibi, a scholar
 Adnan Shah Tipu as Abudl Quddus; Maheen's maternal uncle
 Rashid Farooqui as Ejaz, Surraya's father
 Syed Mohammad Ahmed as Iftikhar Shah “Shah Jee”, Geati Aara's deceased husband

References

External links

Official website

Pakistani drama television series
2011 Pakistani television series debuts
2012 Pakistani television series endings
Television shows set in Karachi
ARY Digital original programming
Yasir Hussain